Sylvain Fleury (born April 30, 1970) is a Canadian former professional ice hockey player. He was selected by the New York Islanders in the 8th round (153rd overall) of the 1990 NHL Entry Draft.

Fleury played major junior hockey with the Longueuil Collège Français of the QMJHL.

Fleury went on to play six years of professional hockey, including the 1992–93 season spent with the Oklahoma City Blazers of the Central Hockey League (CHL) where he led the league with 101 points and was named the CHL's most valuable player.

Career statistics

Awards and honours

References

External links
 

1970 births
Living people
Canadian expatriate ice hockey players in the United States
Canadian ice hockey centres
Dayton Bombers players
Detroit Falcons (CoHL) players
French Quebecers
Ice hockey people from Quebec
Longueuil Collège Français (QMJHL) players
New York Islanders draft picks
Oklahoma City Blazers (1992–2009) players
Sportspeople from Drummondville
South Carolina Stingrays players